The Embassy of Argentina in Moscow is the diplomatic mission of the Argentine Republic to the Russian Federation. It is located at 72 Bolshaya Ordynka Street in the Yakimanka District of Moscow.

The Empire style building was completed in 1823-1824 as tradeswoman Nadezhda Lobanova's home. Lobanova lived here until 1835; subsequent owners also belonged to the merchant estate. Pugovkin family, who owned the house since 1859, altered the facade in line with eclecticism of the period.

Prior to Embassy of Argentina, the building housed Embassy of Rwanda. Embassy of Argentina moved here in 2007 from the historical List house in Glazovsky Lane.

See also 
 Argentina–Russia relations

References 

Argentina–Russia relations
Argentina
Moscow
Houses completed in 1824
Government agencies established in 1947
1947 establishments in the Soviet Union
Cultural heritage monuments in Moscow